The National Afro-Peruvian Museum is a museum dedicated to the acquisition, preservation and exhibition of objects related to the history of African descendants in Peru. Its headquarters is located in the House of Thirteen Coins located on Ancash Street in the historic center of Lima. It was inaugurated on 4 June 2009.

The museum has nine permanent exhibition halls, the main exhibits showing the beginnings of trade in African slaves in Latin America, as well as the slave trade in Peru. In the museum, relics are exhibited from colonial times until the beginning of the Republic.

References

External links
  archived from here

Museums of the African diaspora
Museums in Lima